Daniel George Peterson (born August 31, 1940) is a former Canadian politician. He served in the Legislative Assembly of British Columbia from 1987 to 1991, as a Social Credit member for the constituency of Langley.

References

1940 births
Living people
Politicians from Edmonton
British Columbia Social Credit Party MLAs